Johann Karl Friedrich Rosenkranz (April 23, 1805 – July 14, 1879) was a  German philosopher and pedagogue.

Life
Born in Magdeburg, he read philosophy at Berlin, Halle and Königsberg, devoting himself mainly to the doctrines of Hegel and Schleiermacher. After holding the chair of philosophy at Halle for two years, he became, in 1833, professor at the University of Königsberg. In his last years he was blind.

He died in Königsberg.

Philosophy
Throughout his long professorial career, and in all his numerous publications he remained, in spite of occasional deviations on particular points, loyal to the Hegelian tradition as a whole. In the great division of the Hegelian school, he, in company with Michelet and others, formed the "centre," midway between Erdmann and Gabler on the one hand, and the "extreme left" represented by Strauss, Feuerbach and Bruno Bauer.

Selected works

Philosophical
Kritik der Schleiermacherschen Glaubenslehre (1836)
Psychologie oder Wissenschaft vom subjektiven Geist (1837; 3rd ed., 1863)
Kritische Erläuterungen des Hegelschen Systems (1840)
Vorlesungen über Schelling (1842)
Hegels Leben (1844)
System der Wissenschaft (1850)
Meine Reform der Hegelschen Philosophie (1852)
Ästhetik des Häßlichen" (Königsberg 1853). English: Aesthetics of Ugliness. A Critical Edition. Bloomsbury 2015.Wissenschaft der logischen Idee (1858–59), with a supplement (Epilegomena, 1862)Diderot's Leben und Werke (1866)Hegels Naturphilosophie und die Bearbeitung derselben durch Vera (1868)Hegel als deutscher Nationalphilosoph (1870)Erläuterungen zu Hegels Encyklopädie der philosophischen Wissenschaften'' (1871).

Between 1838 and 1840, Rosenkranz published an edition of the works of Kant in conjunction with F. W. Schubert, to which he appended a history of the Kantian doctrine.

References

External links
 
 
 
 Almost complete collection of Rosenkranz' works as PDFs (most from GoogleBooks)

1805 births
1879 deaths
19th-century German philosophers
Writers from Magdeburg
People from the Province of Saxony
Humboldt University of Berlin alumni
Martin Luther University of Halle-Wittenberg alumni
Academic staff of the Martin Luther University of Halle-Wittenberg
Heidelberg University alumni
Academic staff of the University of Königsberg
Denis Diderot
German male writers